Matěj Beran (born November 11, 1993) is a Czech professional ice hockey player. He is currently playing for HC Dynamo Pardubice of the Czech Extraliga.

Beran made his Czech Extraliga debut playing with HC Plzeň during the 2014-15 Czech Extraliga season.

References

External links

1993 births
Living people
HC Plzeň players
HC Dynamo Pardubice players
Czech ice hockey centres
Sportspeople from Plzeň
Czech expatriate ice hockey players in Canada
Czech expatriate ice hockey players in Sweden